Leila Danette (August 23, 1909 – September 4, 2012) was an American stage, film and television actress, noted for her stage work and for her role as Helen on the short-lived television sitcom, You Take the Kids.

Early life and career
Born in Jacksonville, Florida, Danette attended both Morgan State University and Howard University. Before becoming an actress, she worked as an elementary school teacher in Baltimore and taught speech to students in Washington, D.C.

Danette began acting professionally on the stage at age 67. One of her first substantial roles was opposite James Earl Jones in The Great White Hope. In 1982, she was noted for her performance in The Brothers. In The New York Times Theatre Reviews 1999-2000, D. J. R. Brickner wrote of her performance in Uncle Jack, noting that she was a "Broadway veteran" who imbued her role of Mary with a "touching authenticity".

In addition to stage roles, Danette appeared in several films including The First Deadly Sin (1980) and Garbo Talks (1984). She has also had guest roles on A Different World, The Cosby Show, Law & Order, and Third Watch.

Filmography

References

External links
 
 

1909 births
2012 deaths
American stage actresses
American television actresses
American centenarians
Howard University alumni
Morgan State University alumni
Actresses from Jacksonville, Florida
African-American actresses
American film actresses
African-American centenarians
Women centenarians
20th-century African-American people
21st-century African-American people
20th-century African-American women
21st-century African-American women